Magnolia odora is a species of plant in the family Magnoliaceae. It is found in China, including Hainan, and Vietnam. It is threatened by habitat loss.

References

odora
Trees of Vietnam
Trees of China
Flora of Hainan
Vulnerable flora of Asia
Taxonomy articles created by Polbot